Xanthotryxus is a genus of flies in the family Polleniidae.

Species
Xanthotryxus auratus (Séguy, 1934)
Xanthotryxus bazini (Séguy, 1934)
Xanthotryxus draco Aldrich, 1930
Xanthotryxus ludingensis Fan, 1992
Xanthotryxus melanurus Fan, 1992
Xanthotryxus mongol Aldrich, 1930
Xanthotryxus uniapicalis Fan, 1992

References

Polleniidae
Brachycera genera
Diptera of Asia